Salihli can refer to:

 Salihli
 Salihli, Ergani
 Salihli, Kemaliye
 Salihli railway station